Sippy Grewal is an Indian Punjabi-language film producer known for producing films like Carry on Jatta under his Australian-based banner Sippy Grewal Productions.  Along with his partner Sukha Singh from sukha production Rajesh Banga, a co-director with Grewal in the firm Magic Cloud Media and Entertainment, he acquired international rights to three films produced under T-Series banner; Baby, Roy, and All Is Well.

He is the older brother of Gippy Grewal.

Filmography

 Dharti (2010)
 Jihne Mera Dil Luteya (2011) 
 Carry on Jatta (2012)
 Mirza (2012)
 Tere Naal Love Ho Gaya (2012)
 Best Of Luck (2013)
 Lucky Di Unlucky Story (2013)
 Singh vs Kaur (2013)
 Faraar (2015) 
 Lock (2015) under production
 Ardaas (film)

Recognition

Best Film Critics - Carry On Jatta

References

External links
 

Punjabi people
Living people
Year of birth missing (living people)